Title 10 of the United States Code outlines the role of armed forces in the United States Code.
It provides the legal basis for the roles, missions and organization of each of the services as well as the United States Department of Defense. Each of the five subtitles deals with a separate aspect or component of the armed services.

 Subtitle A—General Military Law, including Uniform Code of Military Justice
 Subtitle B—Army
 Subtitle C—Navy and Marine Corps
 Subtitle D—Air Force and Space Force
 Subtitle E—Reserve Components

The current Title 10 was the result of an overhaul and renumbering of the former Title 10 and Title 34 into one title by an act of Congress on August 10, 1956.

Title 32 outlines the related but different legal basis for the roles, missions and organization of the United States National Guard in the United States Code.

References

External links

U.S. Code Title 10, via United States Government Printing Office
U.S. Code Title 10, via Cornell University

 
Title 10
10